Guadeloupe, a région and overseas département of France in the Caribbean, does not have an official coat of arms.

Logo
The regional government uses a logo showing a stylized sun and bird on a green and blue square, with REGION GUADELOUPE underlined in yellow inscribed beneath it. The device is central to the flag used by the government of the région.

Unofficial coat of arms
Guadeloupe also has an unofficial coat of arms based on the coat of arms of its capital Basse-Terre. The arms have a black field with a 30-rayed yellow sun and a green sugarcane, and a blue stripe with three yellow fleurs-de-lis on the top. The emblem appears on 10 euro collector coins minted by Monnaie de Paris, as well as some fabric badges.

See also
Flag of Guadeloupe

References

External links

Guadeloupe
Guadeloupean culture
Guadeloupe
Guadeloupe